Mariaella beddomei is a species of air-breathing land slug, a terrestrial pulmonate gastropod mollusk in the family Ariophantidae.

The specific name is in honor of Richard Henry Beddome.

Distribution 
This species lives in India. It is endemic to Western Ghats.<ref>Mavinkurve R. G., Shanbhag S. P. & Madhyastha N. A. 2004. [http://www.zoosprint.org/ZooPrintJournal/2004/November/1684-1686.pdf Checklist of terrestrial gastropods of Karnataka, India]. Zoos' Print Journal 19(11):1684-1686.</ref> Its localities include Travancore Hills.

 Shell description 
The internal shell is thinner than in Mariaella dussumieri, shelly, flat and smooth beneath, white, with close, concentric lines of growth. The length of the adult shell is 12 mm, the breath is 6.5 mm.

 Anatomy 
The body of the animal varies greatly in color from uniform ochre to deep grey-black or spotted. There are no raised ridges on the shell-lobes. It has more numerous teeth in the radula, the number in a row being 122 . 5 . 21 . 1 . 21 . 5 . 122 (148 . 1 . 148), and the shape differing somewhat. There are also differences in the genitalia, the spermatheca and the expansion in the free oviduct (ovitheca) having different forms.

References
The article incorporates public domain text from the reference.

Ariophantidae
Gastropods described in 1888